Spiro Bellkameni (1885-1912) was an Albanian military commander and activist of the Albanian National Awakening. He led one of the most important bands during the Albanian revolts of the 1900-1910s.

Life 
Born in Bellkamen, in the Manastir Vilayet of the Ottoman Empire in 1885 he was a close associate of Themistokli Gërmenji and Mihal Grameno. In 1906 he was a member of Bajo Topulli's band that assassinated the Pontic Greek bishop of Korçë Photios as retribution for the assassination of Kristo Negovani, which was instigated by Photios. During the Albanian Revolt of 1911 he defeated an Ottoman contingent in Mali i Thatë.

Sources 

1885 births
1912 deaths
People from Manastir vilayet
Activists of the Albanian National Awakening
People from Perasma